"Close Your Eyes" is a 1973 hit song recorded by Canadian trio Edward Bear.  It was the lead single released from their fourth and final studio album, Close Your Eyes and was the biggest hit from the LP.  The song was written by Larry Evoy, and was a sequel to their best-known hit, "Last Song".

"Close Your Eyes" spent 12 weeks on the U.S. charts, and peaked at number 37 on the Billboard Hot 100. It was a major hit in their home nation, where it reached number three.  It was a sizeable Adult Contemporary hit in both nations, reaching number 11 in the U.S. and number four in Canada. It was the group's final top ten hit.

The song was included on their 1984 compilation LP, The Best Of The Bear.

Chart performance

Weekly charts

Year-end charts

References

External links
 Lyrics of this song
 

1973 songs
1973 singles
Capitol Records singles
Canadian soft rock songs
1970s ballads
Edward Bear songs